Psi Virginis (ψ Vir, ψ Virginis) is a suspected binary star system in the zodiac constellation of Virgo. It can be seen with the naked eye and has an apparent visual magnitude of about 4.8. Based upon the annual parallax shift of 5.99 milliarcseconds, the distance to this star is roughly 540 light years. The angular size of Psi Virginis was measured on December 26, 1975 during an occultation by the Moon, yielding the estimate .

The primary component is an evolved red giant star with a stellar classification of M3 IIICa-1. It is an irregular variable with seven measured pulsation periods ranging from 22.4 to 162.6 days, and amplitudes ranging up to 0.m022. There is a magnitude 8.3 companion at an angular separation of 0.04 arcseconds.

References

Virgo (constellation)
Slow irregular variables
M-type giants
F-type main-sequence stars
Spectroscopic binaries
Virginis, Psi
Virginis, 040
112142
062985
4902
Durchmusterung objects